William Buckenham was a 16th-century priest and academic.

Buckenham was born in Great Livermere. He was educated at Gonville Hall, graduating B.A. in 1483; MA in 1486; and D.D. in 1507. He was Vice-Chancellor of the University of Cambridge from 1508 to 1509; and Master of Gonville Hall from 1513 to 1536. He held livings at Barnwell; Holy Sepulchre, Cambridge; and St Michael Coslany, Norwich. He died on 18 June 1540.

References 

Alumni of Gonville Hall, Cambridge
Fellows of Gonville Hall, Cambridge
Masters of Gonville Hall, Cambridge
15th-century English clergy
16th-century English clergy
1540 deaths
Clergy from Suffolk
Vice-Chancellors of the University of Cambridge
People from the Borough of St Edmundsbury